Paraloricaria is a genus of armored catfishes native to South America.

Species
There are currently three recognized species in this genus:
 Paraloricaria agastor Isbrücker, 1979
 Paraloricaria commersonoides (Devincenzi, 1943)
 Paraloricaria vetula (Valenciennes, 1835)

Description 

Paraloricaria shows a strongly flattened body, weak postorbital notches, long and ramified maxillary barbels, and overall, conspicuous fringed barbels.

Male Paraloricaria are abdomino-lip brooders.

References

Loricariini
Fish of South America
Catfish genera
Taxa named by Isaäc J. H. Isbrücker
Freshwater fish genera